The eighth X Games were held in Philadelphia in 15–19 August 2002. The events included Moto X (Big Air, Step Up and Freestyle), Skateboarding (Park, Vert Best Trick, Vert Doubles,  Vert, Street and Street Best Trick), BMX (Park, Flatland, Vert, Dirt and Downhill), Wakeboarding (Men and Women), Aggressive Inline (Men's Vert, Men's Park and Women's Park) and Speed Climbing (Men and Women).

Results

Moto X - Big Air

Moto X - Step Up

Moto X - Freestyle

Skateboarding - Park

Skateboarding - Vert Best Trick

Skateboarding - Vert Doubles

Skateboarding - Vert

Skateboarding - Street

Skateboarding - Street Best Trick

BMX - Park

BMX - Flatland

BMX - Vert

BMX - Dirt

BMX - Downhill

Wakeboarding - Men

Wakeboarding - Women

Aggressive Inline - Men's Vert

Aggressive Inline - Men's Park

Aggressive Inline - Women's Park

Speed Climbing - Men

Speed Climbing - Women

References 
X Games VIII Website at EXPN.com

8
Sports in Philadelphia
Aggressive skating
2002 in multi-sport events
August 2002 sports events in the United States